These are the Canadian number-one albums of 2014. The chart is compiled by Nielsen Soundscan and published by Jam! Canoe, issued every Sunday. The chart also appears in Billboard magazine as Top Canadian Albums.

Note that Billboard publishes charts with an issue date approximately 7–10 days in advance.

Number-one albums

See also 
 List of Canadian Hot 100 number-one singles of 2014
 List of number-one digital songs of 2014 (Canada)

References

External links 
 Top 100 albums in Canada on Jam
 Billboard Top Canadian Albums

2014
Canada Albums
2014 in Canadian music